Pakicetus is an extinct genus of amphibious cetacean of the family Pakicetidae, which was endemic to Pakistan during the Eocene, about 50 million years ago. The vast majority of paleontologists regard it as the most basal whale, representing a transitional stage between land mammals and whales. It belongs to the even-toed ungulates with the closest living non-cetacean relative being the hippopotamus.

Description

Pakicetus looked very different from modern cetaceans, and its body shape more resembled those of land-dwelling hoofed mammals. Unlike all later cetaceans, it had four fully functional long legs. Pakicetus had a long snout; a typical complement of teeth that included incisors, canines, premolars, and molars; a distinct and flexible neck; and a very long and robust tail. As in most land mammals, the nose was at the tip of the snout.

Reconstructions of pakicetids that followed the discovery of composite skeletons often depicted them with fur; however, given their relatively close relationships with hippos, they may have had sparse body hair.

The first fossil found consisted of an incomplete skull with a skull cap and a broken mandible with some teeth. Based on the detail of the teeth, the molars suggest that the animal could rend and tear flesh. Wear, in the form of scrapes on the molars, indicated that Pakicetus ground its teeth as it chewed its food. Because of the tooth wear, Pakicetus is thought to have eaten fish and other small animals. The teeth also suggest that Pakicetus had herbivorous and omnivorous ancestors.

Palaeobiology

Possible semi-aquatic nature
It was illustrated on the cover of Science as a semiaquatic, vaguely crocodile-like mammal, diving after fish.

Somewhat more complete skeletal remains were discovered in 2001, prompting the view that Pakicetus was primarily a land animal about the size of a wolf.  wrote that "Pakicetids were terrestrial mammals, no more amphibious than a tapir."

However,  argued that "the orbits ... of these cetaceans were located close together on top of the skull, as is common in aquatic animals that live in water but look at emerged objects. Just like Indohyus, limb bones of pakicetids are osteosclerotic, also suggestive of aquatic habitat" (since heavy bones provide ballast). "This peculiarity could indicate that Pakicetus could stand in water, almost totally immersed, without losing visual contact with the air."

Sensory capabilities
The Pakicetus skeleton reveals several details regarding the creature's unique senses and provides a newfound ancestral link between terrestrial and aquatic animals. As previously mentioned, the Pakicetus''' upward-facing eye placement was a significant indication of its habitat. Even more so, however, was its auditory abilities. Like all other cetaceans, Pakicetus had a thickened skull bone known as the auditory bulla, which was specialized for underwater hearing. Cetaceans also all categorically exhibit a large mandibular foramen within the lower jaw, which holds a fat pack and extends towards the ear, both of which are also associated with underwater hearing. "Pakicetus is the only cetacean in which the mandibular foramen is small, as is the case in all terrestrial animals. It thus lacked the fat pad, and sounds reached its eardrum following the external auditory meatus as in terrestrial mammals. Thus the hearing mechanism of Pakicetus is the only known intermediate between that of land mammals and aquatic cetaceans." With both the auditory and visual senses in mind, as well as the typical diet of Pakicetus, one might assume that the creature was able to attack both aquatic and terrestrial prey from a low vantage point.

History of discovery
The first fossil, a skull fragment of P. inachus, was found in 1981 in Pakistan. Subsequent fossils of Pakicetus were also found in Pakistan, hence the generic name Pakicetus. The fossils were found in the Kuldana Formation in Kohat in northern Pakistan and were dated as early to early-middle Eocene in age. The discovery of Pakicetus played an important role in solidifying the inferences that revolved around the evolution of whales. The fossil indicated that whales swam up and down with their vertebral column, which caused their feet to move up and down like otters and their land movements were similar to sea lions; even their limbs protracted and retracted on land. In contrast, the origin of cetaceans, which includes whales, began as four-legged land animals who actively used locomotion and were great runners as a result. 

The fossils came out of red terrigenous sediments bounded largely by shallow marine deposits typical of coastal environments caused by the Tethys Ocean. Speculation is that many major marine banks flourished with the presence of this prehistoric whale. According to the location of fossil findings, the animals preferred a shallow habitat that neighbored decent-sized land. Assortments of limestone, dolomite, stone mud and other varieties of different coloured sands have been predicted to be a favourable habitat for Pakicetus. During the Eocene, Pakistan was an independent island-continent off the coastal region of Eurasia, and therefore an ideal habitat for the evolution and diversification of the Pakicetidae.

ClassificationPakicetus was classified as an early cetacean due to characteristic features of the inner ear found only in cetaceans (namely, the large auditory bulla is formed from the ectotympanic bone only). It was recognized as the earliest member of the family Pakicetidae. Thus, Pakicetus represents a transitional taxon between extinct land mammals and modern cetaceans.

 believed Pakicetus to be a mesonychid. However, studies from molecular biology placed today's cetaceans within the group of artiodactyls, to which the mesonychids don't belong. In 2001, fossils of ancient whales were found that featured an ankle bone, the astragalus, with a "double pulley" shape characteristic of artiodactyls. The redescription of the primitive, semi-aquatic small deer-like artiodactyl Indohyus, and the discovery of its cetacean-like inner ear, simultaneously put an end to the idea that whales were descended from mesonychids, while demonstrating that Pakicetus'', and all other cetaceans, are artiodactyls.

See also

 Evolution of cetaceans

Notes

References

 
 
 
 
 
 
 
 
 
 
 

Transitional fossils
Pakicetidae
Fossils of Pakistan
Eocene mammals of Asia
Prehistoric cetacean genera
Fossil taxa described in 1981
Taxa named by Philip D. Gingerich